"Eso No Va a Suceder" is a song written and recorded by the American musical duo Ha*Ash. It was released on August 8, 2018 as the third of the single from their fifth studio album 30 de Febrero (2017). The song then included on their live album Ha*Ash: En Vivo (2019). It was written by Ashley Grace, Hanna Nicole and Edgar Barrera.

Background and release 
"Eso No Va a Suceder" was written by Ashley Grace, Hanna Nicole and Edgar Barrera and produced by Hanna, Barrera and Joe London. The band started working on the song during the 1F Hecho Realidad Tour. It was confirmed the single to be the third single from the album on August 6, 2018. The song went to Latin radio stations in early September.

Music video 
A lyric video for "Eso No Va a Suceder" was released on November 28, 2017. It was directed by Diego Álvarez. Here they are dressed in white wedding dresses with yet another classy style. Some scenes show a white dress burning and torn, while Hanna is seen smashing a wedding cake. , the video has over 55 million views on YouTube.

The music video for "Eso No Va a Suceder" was released on August 8, 2018. It was directed by Emiliano Castro and Ernesto Lomeli. The video was filmed in Toluca, México. The video stars Ha*Ash with actress Renata Notni, TV host Natalia Téllez, and Instagram influencer Dhasia Wezka. , the video has over 90 million views on YouTube.

The acoustic video for "Eso No Va a Suceder" was released on September 28, 2018. , the video has over 1,5 million views on YouTube.

The live video for "Eso No Va a Suceder", recorded live for the live album Ha*Ash: En Vivo, was released on December 6, 2019. The video was filmed in Auditorio Nacional, Mexico City.

Commercial performance 
The track peaked at number 34 in the Latin Pop Songs charts in the United States. In Mexico, the song peaked at number one on the Mexican Singles Chart, and Monitor Latino. On November 11, 2018 the song was certified gold in México. On September 17, the song was certified Platinum in México.

Live performances 
On November 11, 2018, the duo appeared on Premios Telehit, and also performed "Eso No Va a Suceder".

Credits and personnel 
Credits adapted from Genius.

Recording and management

 Recording Country: United States
 Sony / ATV Discos Music Publishing LLC / Westwood Publishing
 (P) 2017 Sony Music Entertainment México, S.A. De C.V.

Ha*Ash
 Ashley Grace  – vocals, guitar, songwriting
 Hanna Nicole  – vocals, guitar, songwriting, production
Additional personnel
 Edgar Barrera  – songwriting, edition, engineer, production
 Joe London  – edition, engineer, production
 Luis Barrera Jr  – edition

Charts

Weekly charts

Year-end charts

Certifications

Release history

References 

Ha*Ash songs
Songs written by Ashley Grace
Songs written by Hanna Nicole
Songs written by Edgar Barrera
Song recordings produced by Edgar Barrera
Song recordings produced by Joe London
2017 songs
2018 singles
Songs with feminist themes
Spanish-language songs
Sony Music Latin singles
Monitor Latino Top General number-one singles